Fascinus typicus is a species of sea snail, a marine gastropod mollusk in the family Buccinoidea (unassigned), the whelks.

Description

Distribution

References

 Fraussen, K. (2010). Buccinidae checklist. Pers. Com.

Buccinoidea (unassigned)
Gastropods described in 1903